First United Methodist Church is a historic church at 6th Ave. and 19th Street, North in Birmingham, Alabama.  It was built in 1891 and added to the National Register of Historic Places in 1982.

References

Methodist churches in Alabama
Churches on the National Register of Historic Places in Alabama
National Register of Historic Places in Birmingham, Alabama
Gothic Revival church buildings in Alabama
Churches completed in 1891
Churches in Birmingham, Alabama